The Hotel Wolcott at 4 West 31st Street between Fifth and Sixth Avenues in the Midtown East neighborhood of Manhattan, New York City, United States was built between 1902 and 1904 by developer William C. Dewey and was designed by the prominent architect John H. Duncan, who employed a bold French Beaux-Arts style combined with French Neo Classicism. The hotel was named after Henry Roger Wolcott, a businessman, politician, and philanthropist.

Before it was even completed, the building was leased by Dewey to James H. Breslin, a prominent hotelier of the time, for three years. Nonetheless, Dewey had difficulty with the financing for the building: unable to purchase steel locally, he imported it from Europe, which caused an unusually long construction period, which in turn made it difficult for Dewey to pay his creditors. In early 1905 The American Mortgage Company repossessed the building, which was sold at auction. Breslin's lease remained, but the hotel passed through the hands of a series of owners in the following decades.

The hotel was popular with travelers, but also housed many permanent residents, including dancer Isadora Duncan and Doris Duke, the heiress. Other prominent guests of the hotel included Edith Wharton and Henry Miller, and Buddy Holly and the Everly Brothers stayed there while recording at Beltone Studios, which was in the building. The hotel also hosted events such as the meeting where Col. Jake Ruppert and Col. Tillinghast Huston purchased the New York Yankees in 1914 and Fiorello La Guardia's inauguration ball in 1938.

On December 20, 2011 the hotel was designated a New York City landmark by the New York City Landmarks Preservation Commission.

In 2020, the hotel become a transitory home for anyone who is homeless upon their release from jail or prison. The hotel is almost entirely staffed by formerly incarcerated people, and is part of the Exodus Transitional Community program.

See also
List of New York City Designated Landmarks in Manhattan from 14th to 59th Streets
National Register of Historic Places listings in Manhattan from 14th to 59th Streets

References

External links

 

Hotels in Manhattan
Commercial buildings completed in 1904
Beaux-Arts architecture in New York City
New York City Designated Landmarks in Manhattan
Neoclassical architecture in New York City
Midtown Manhattan
1904 establishments in New York City
Manger hotels